Kaedan Korczak (born Jan 29, 2001) is a Canadian professional ice hockey defenceman currently playing for the Henderson Silver Knights of the American Hockey League (AHL) as a prospect for the Vegas Golden Knights of the National Hockey League (NHL).

Playing career
Korczak was selected by the Golden Knights in the second round of the 2019 NHL Entry Draft, and played junior hockey with the Kelowna Rockets of the Western Hockey League (WHL). He signed his three-year entry-level contract on December 21, 2019, and made his NHL debut with Vegas on February 1, 2022.

Korczak recorded his first NHL point on January 2, 2023, with a secondary assist on a Nicolas Roy second-period goal.

International play

 

Korczak made his international debut with Canada Black at the 2017 World U-17 Hockey Challenge, recording one point in five games. He then appeared for the Canadian under-18 team in the 2018 Hlinka Gretzky Cup and 2019 IIHF World U18 Championships. He won a silver medal with Canada at the 2021 IIHF World Junior Championships.

Personal life
Kaedan's younger brother Ryder Korczak is also a hockey player who is currently a centre for the Moose Jaw Warriors of the WHL.  Ryder was drafted by the New York Rangers in the 3rd round of the 2021 NHL Entry Draft.

Career statistics

Regular season and playoffs

International

References

External links

2001 births
Living people
Canadian ice hockey defencemen
Henderson Silver Knights players
Ice hockey people from Saskatchewan
Kelowna Rockets players
Sportspeople from Yorkton
Vegas Golden Knights draft picks
Vegas Golden Knights players